This is an incomplete list of bridges in the city of Rome, in Italy:

Pons Sublicius (around 642 BC)
Ponte di Castel Giubileo (built 1951) 
Ponte di Tor di Quinto (1960)
Ponte Cestio (1st century BC), also called Ponte San Bartolomeo
Ponte Flaminio (1932–1951) 
Ponte Milvio (207 BC; formerly called Ponte Mollo) 
Ponte Nomentano (1st century BC)
Ponte Duca d'Aosta (1939–1942)
Ponte della Musica-Armando Trovajoli (2008–2011)
Ponte Risorgimento (1911) 
Ponte Matteotti (1929; pre 1945 called Ponte delle Milizie or Ponte Littorio) 
Ponte Nenni (1971–1972) 
Ponte Regina Margherita (1886–1891, also called Ponte Margherita) 
Ponte Cavour (1891–1896) 
Ponte Umberto I (1885) 
Ponte Sant'Angelo (134, formerly called Pons Aelius (Ponte Elio)) 
Ponte Vittorio Emanuele II (1886–1911; also called Ponte Vittorio) 
Ponte Principe Amedeo (1942, instead of Ponte dei Fiorentini) 
Ponte Mazzini (1904–1908) 
Ponte Sisto (1473–1479; instead of Ponte di Agrippa, also called Ponte Aurelio, Ponte Antonino or Ponte di Valentiniano, formerly called Pons fractus or Pons ruptus ) 
Ponte Garibaldi (1888) 
Ponte San Bartolomeo (mid 1st century BC, formerly called Pons Cestius)
Ponte dei Quattro Capi (62 BC, called Pons Fabricius) 
Fragments of Ponte Rotto (241 BC, formerly called Pons Aemilius (Ponte Emilio), Ponte di Lepido, Ponte lapideo, Ponte dei Senatori or Ponte Maggiore) 
Ponte Palatino (1886–1891), also called Ponte Inglese, Ponte degli inglesi
Ponte Aventino (1914–1919;  also called Ponte Sublicio) 
Ponte Testaccio (1938–1948)
Ponte dell'Industria (1863; also called Ponte di San Paolo or Ponte di Ferro, formerly a Railway bridge) 
Ponte della Scienza (2008-2014)
Ponte Settimia Spizzichino (2009-2012)
Ponte Marconi (1937–1954) 
Ponte della Magliana (1930–1948)
Ponte di Mezzocammino (1943-1951)

See also 
 Roman bridge

External links
www.romaspqr.it Overview (Italian)

Rome
Bridges
Rome